There are over 20,000 Grade II* listed buildings in England. This page is a list of these buildings in the City of Portsmouth in Hampshire.

City of Portsmouth

|}

Notes

External links
 Grade I listed buildings in Portsmouth

Portsmouth
Portsmouth
Buildings and structures in Portsmouth
Portsmouth-related lists
Lists of listed buildings in Portsmouth